Allen James (born April 14, 1964) is an American race walker.  He competed in two Olympic Games: the 1992 Barcelona Olympics in the 20 km walk and the 1996 Atlanta Olympics in the 50 km walk.

He set five (5) American records in the span 7 months from the fall of 1993 to the spring of 1994: 20,000m (track), 25,000m (track), 2 Hour (track), 30 km (road) and 50 km (road).

References

American male racewalkers
1964 births
Living people
Athletes (track and field) at the 1992 Summer Olympics
Athletes (track and field) at the 1996 Summer Olympics
Olympic track and field athletes of the United States